Karin Apollonia Müller (born 1963, Heidelberg, Germany) is a German contemporary photographer artist. She has received numerous awards, grants and fellowships. Her work is published, exhibited and is in the following collections: The Whitney Museum of American Art, Museum of Modern Art - New York, Armand Hammer Museum of Art, Los Angeles County Museum of Art among others.

Collections 
 Whitney Museum of American Art, New York, NY USA
 Museum of Modern Art, New York, NY USA
San Francisco Museum of Modern Art, San Francisco, CA, USA
New School, New York, NY USA
New York Library, New York, NY USA
Armand Hammer Museum of Art, Los Angeles, CA USA
 Los Angeles County Museum of Art, CA USA
Photography Museum of San Francisco, San Francisco, CA USA 
Nevada Art Museum, Reno, NV USA 
Allen Memorial Art Museum, Oberlin, OH USA 
Institut für Auslandsangelegenheiten, Berlin, Deutschland
FRAC centre, Paris, Frankreich
Soho House, London, GB

Awards 
 1995 DAAD Fellowship, Los Angeles, USA and American Samoa, Polynesia
1996 Villa Aurora, Pacific Palisades, CA USA 
2000 Lannan Foundation Residency Program, Galisteo, NM, USA
2001 The J. Paul Getty/CalArts Commission, Los Angeles, CA, USA
2006 Residency Program at Lijiang Studios, Lijiang, Yunnan, China
2015 Residency Program Bangalore, India, Goethe Institut
2016 Omne Residency, Castelfranco, Italy

Exhibitions

 2020  Far Out, Citylights; Nevada Museum of Art, Reno, Nevada, USA
 2019  Properties of human beings; Kunstwerden, Essen, Deutschland
 2014 World’s Edge; Armory Center for the Arts, Pasadena, CA, USA
 2014 Far Out; Google Headquarter, Los Angeles, USA
 2013  Far Out; Diane Rosenstein Fine Art, Los Angeles, USA
 2012  Gate; Julie Saul Gallery, New York, USA
 2007  On Edge; Karyn Lovegrove Gallery, Los Angeles, USA
 2005  Bunkerscapes; Van der Grinten Galerie, Köln, Germany
 2004  Terra Cognita; Julie Saul Gallery, New York, USA
 2003  Angels in Fall; Van der Grinten Galerie, Köln, Germany
 2002  Bunkerscapes; Karyn Lovegrove Gallery, Los Angeles, USA
 2001  Angels in Fall; Karyn Lovegrove Gallery, Los Angeles, USA
 2000  Angels in Fall; Julie Saul Gallery, New York, USA
 2000  Angels in Fall; Photographers Gallery, London, UK
 1999  Silent summer; Craig Krull Gallery, Santa Monica, USA
 1999  Angels in Fall; University of Iowa, Iowa, USA
 1998  Angels in Fall; DG Galerie, München, Germany
 1998  Angels in Fall; Stephen Cohen Gallery, Los Angeles, USA
 1997  Angels in Fall; Sam Francis Gallery/Santa Monica, CA, USA in cooperation with Getty Museum L.A., Exiles and Emigres

Books

References

1963 births
Living people
20th-century German artists
20th-century German women artists
21st-century German artists
21st-century German women artists
Artists from Heidelberg